Ken Fletcher (born 21 January 1948) is a former Australian rules footballer who played for the Essendon Bombers. He is the father of Dustin Fletcher who was drafted into the club through the father son rule.

A former Essendon High School student who grew up in East Keilor, Victoria, Fletcher had two footballers as neighbours, they being Ken Peucker (No 29 Essendon) and Ted Flemming, a WA Sandover Medal winner (1930). Ken and his older brother practiced football skills daily in a nearby paddock as teenagers. Fletcher was a versatile footballer and played in many positions during his 264-game career for the Bombers. He excelled as a wingman and half back flanker.

He won the club's best and fairest award in 1978 and represented Victoria throughout the 1970s. A broken leg forced him to retire in 1980 and he left the club as their fourth most experienced player of all time. He did, however, continue playing in country football as captain-coach of Tatura.

In Round 7 of 2014, Ken and his son Dustin claimed the record of most VFL/AFL games played by a father-son combination, with 648 games between them.

External links

Ken Fletcher's Essendon Football Club profile

1948 births
Australian rules footballers from Melbourne
Essendon Football Club players
Tatura Football Club players
Crichton Medal winners
Living people
People from Keilor East, Victoria